Różanka may refer to the following places in Poland:
Różanka, Lower Silesian Voivodeship (south-west Poland)
Różanka, Lublin Voivodeship (east Poland)
Różanka, Subcarpathian Voivodeship (south-east Poland)
Różanka, Greater Poland Voivodeship (west-central Poland)

and Różanka Rose Garden in Szczecin, Poland